Ante Pavić and Danilo Petrović were the defending champions but chose to defend their title with different partners. Pavić partnered Hans Hach Verdugo but lost in the quarterfinals to Gonzalo Escobar and Luis David Martínez. Petrović partnered Alex Hernández but lost in the quarterfinals to Matt Reid and John-Patrick Smith.

Reid and Smith won the title after defeating Escobar and Martínez 7–6(12–10), 6–3 in the final.

Seeds

Draw

References

External links
 Main draw

Puerto Vallarta Open - Doubles